Guntur Engineering College is one of the engineering colleges in Guntur, which was established in 2008. It is approved by All India Council for Technical Education and is affiliated to JNTU Kakinada. It is a private institution founded from Krishna Sai educational Society and the chairman of the college is M.Nara Hari Rao.

Academics
Guntur Engineering College was established in the year 2008 with sole aim of providing quality higher technical education to rural sector through its dedicated and committed staff. This opportunity made the students to become technologically superior and to serve the nation. With fulfillment of this noble cause, the local rural students have become enlightened individuals so that they became tool in the role of development of the nation.

Offering Courses

B.Tech. - CSE, ECE, EEE, ME, CIVIL

M.Tech. - CSE, EEE(Power Systems, Power Electronic & Electrical Devices), ME(Machine Design, Thermal Engineering), ECE(VLSI)

MBA

DIPLOMA : ECE, EEE, ME

The Guntur Engineering College recognizes the value of quality education and employs qualified and experienced faculty. All faculty members are well acclaimed and admired in their respective field.

MISSION
 Imparting sound technical knowledge to students at all levels including diploma, undergraduate, post graduate, and transforming the personality to address the challenges of dynamic world.
 Training the students to acquire wisdom through innovative research that encourages entrepreneurship and economic development of the country.
VISION
 "To be recognized as an premier institution in engineering education, research and the application of knowledge to benefit society globally for making the better world".

References

External links
Guntur Engineering College website

Colleges in Guntur
Engineering colleges in Andhra Pradesh
2008 establishments in Andhra Pradesh